Cootie may refer to:

People
 Cootie Stark (1927–2005), American blues guitarist, singer, and songwriter
 Cootie Williams (1911–1985), American jazz, jump blues, and rhythm and blues trumpeter

Slang
 Cootie, a slang term for head lice infestation
 Cootie, an alternate name for a sideswiper manual telegraph key
 Cooter Brown, or Cootie Brown, a name used in metaphors and similes for drunkenness in the Southern United States

See also
 
 
 Cooties (disambiguation)